The student regent is a position on the University of California Board of Regents created by a 1974 California ballot proposition to represent University of California (UC) students on the university system's governing board. Student regents serve an approximately one-year term as 'student regent-designate', followed by a one-year term as a full voting member of the Regents. The 2022–2023 student regent is Marlenee Blas Pedrail, a UC Berkeley law student, and the student regent-designate is Merhawi Tesfai, a UCLA graduate student.

Selection process 
Virtually any UC student in good academic standing may apply to be student regent. Southern and northern regional UC student nominating commissions annually select ten semifinalists from those who apply. These semifinalists are then interviewed by the University of California Student Association (UCSA) board of directors. The board chooses three applicants, who are then interviewed by the Regents’ Special Committee to Select a Student Regent. The Regents may reject the list of finalists. The committee then recommends a nominee to the full board of University of California Regents, which then votes on the nominee. Once approved, the nominee becomes 'student regent-designate', shadowing the student regent for approximately one academic year until the beginning of their formal, year-long term on July 1 of the next year. Traditionally, the position alternates between undergraduate and graduate students as well as between the various UC campuses. However, some students involved in the selection process have said that it may be biased towards graduate students as well as students from UCLA and UC Berkeley, traditionally considered the flagship campuses of the UC system.

History 

Student regents have been noted for their support of affirmative action and diversity, and opposition of nuclear weapons research and fee increases.

In May 2011, student regent Jesse Cheng resigned after being arrested for allegedly committing sexual battery against a UCLA graduate student. Cheng was found responsible for "unwanted touching" by UC Irvine's student conduct office, but the Orange County District Attorney declined to file charges against him. The student regent-designate at the time, Alfredo Mireles, was appointed voting student regent after Cheng's resignation.

In 2013, the nomination of Sadia Saifuddin, the first Muslim student regent, was criticized by pro-Israel and conservative entities, such as StandWithUs and David Horowitz, due to Saifuddin's past support for disinvestment from Israel. In the final vote to appoint Saifuddin, only Regent Richard C. Blum abstained from voting in favor. Regent Norman Pattiz was not present at the time of the vote. During June 2013, student regent Jonathan Stein was a member of the Regents committee that selected Janet Napolitano to be nominated and presented to the full Board of Regents for a confirmation vote.

In 2014, the appointment of Saifuddin's successor, Avi Oved, was opposed by students and student groups, including Students for Justice in Palestine, due to conflict of interest and transparency concerns. The Daily Californian reported that when running for an elected student government position at UCLA, Oved received campaign donations from Israeli-American businessman Adam Milstein that were secretly routed through Hillel's UCLA chapter. Oved and his supporters responded that UCLA's student government election regulations did not require disclosure of donors, and that the opposition was motivated by anti-Semitism. The UC Student Association nominating committee voted to delay its nomination of Oved in order to fully investigate, but the Board of Regents rejected the delay and voted to appoint Oved, with only Saifuddin voting in opposition.

In January 2016, Oved and his successor, Marcela Ramirez, attended costly Regents' dinners paid for by university funds. The dinners were criticized by state legislative leaders, government watchdog groups, student government leaders, and students at large. The dinners appeared to violate university policy, and after The San Francisco Chronicle publicly reported the dinners' existence and funding, university leaders said they would no longer pay for the dinners.

In May 2016, UC Berkeley Law student Paul Monge Rodriguez was nominated to be student regent for the 2017-2018 academic year. Monge previously criticized Berkeley's discipline of then-law dean Sujit Choudhry for sexual harassment, calling it a "slap on the wrist".

List of student regents

References

External links 
  at the Board of Regents website
 Regent Paul Monge at the Board of Regents website
 Regent-designate Devon Graves at the Board of Regents website
 University of California Regents Policy 1202: Policy on Appointment of Student Regent
 "Representative or Trustee? The Complex History of the UC Student Regent" at The Daily Californian

University of California regents
University of California
Political history of California
Politics of California